Thasus is an insect genus of the Coreidae, or leaf-footed bugs. It is a genus in the New World Nematopodini tribe that feeds on plants. It is chiefly found in Central America, but species also occur in South America, and as far north as the American Southwest.

History
In 1862, Carl Stål distinguished two types in the then existing genus Pachylis, those where the muscle widening (dilation) of the hind-leg tibia occurs only ventrally (downward), and those where it occurs on both sides (ventrally and dorsally). In 1865, he separated these into two genera, leaving the ventral only type in Pachylis, and moving the three species with the muscle widening on both sides into the newly established genus Thasus. Those three species then became Thasus acutangulus, Thasus gigas and Thasus heteropus. In 1867 he published a key to the two genera.  Van Duzee later picked Thasus gigas as the type species (logotype) for the genus, as he felt that it best represented the characteristics of the genus.

Species
 Thasus acutangulus  
 Thasus carchinus 
 Thasus gigas 
 Thasus heteropus 
 Thasus luteolus 
 Thasus neocalifornicus 
 Thasus odonnellae 
 Thasus rutilus

References 

Coreidae genera
Hemiptera of North America
Hemiptera of Central America
Hemiptera of South America
Nematopodini